Eledona is a genus of beetles belonging to the family Tenebrionidae.

The species of this genus are found in Europe.

Species:
 Eledona agricola (Herbst, 1783) 
 Eledona hellenica Reitter, 1885

References

Tenebrionidae